Alican Kaynar (born 30 October 1988) is a Turkish yacht racer competing in the Finn class.

Alican Kaynar is a student of Industrial engineering at the Bahçeşehir University, Istanbul.

He qualified for participation at the 2012 Summer Olympics, in the Finn class event, he placed 18th with 154 points.  He competed in the same event at the 2016 Olympics, finishing in 13th.

Achievements

References

External links
 
 
 

1988 births
Living people
Turkish male sailors (sport)
Olympic sailors of Turkey
Sailors at the 2012 Summer Olympics – Finn
Sailors at the 2016 Summer Olympics – Finn
Sailors at the 2020 Summer Olympics – Finn
Fenerbahçe athletes
Sportspeople from Istanbul